"My Way" is a song by Scottish  DJ and producer Calvin Harris. The song was released on 16 September 2016. Harris announced the single on his Twitter page five days prior to its release. Like his previous 2010s singles "Summer" and "Feel So Close", Harris returns as a vocalist. It peaked at number four on the UK Singles Chart. Outside the United Kingdom, the single topped the charts in the Czech Republic and Hungary and peaked within the top ten of the charts in Australia, Austria, Belgium, France, Germany, Israel, Lebanon, the Netherlands, New Zealand, Norway, Paraguay, Poland, the Republic of Ireland, Slovakia, Sweden and Switzerland and the top twenty of the charts in Canada, Denmark, Finland, Italy, Portugal and Spain.

Background and composition

On 6 September 2016, Harris uploaded the artwork for "My Way" without the song title to his Twitter and Instagram accounts, causing people to believe that this was hinting at a new song being in the works. Harris announced the single along with its official artwork to his Twitter page on 12 September 2016, four days prior to its release.

"My Way" is an uptempo, tropical house song.
The song is written in the key of E minor with a common time tempo of 120 beats per minute. Harris's vocals span from D3 to G4 in the song.

Harris stated on the British radio station Heart and other interviews, that the lyrics are about his career in the grocery store he used to work in and how it prevented him from moving to London to progress in his music production.

Music video
The music video for the song was released to YouTube on 28 October 2016 through Calvin Harris' official Vevo account. It was directed by long-time collaborator, Emil Nava.

Chart performance
In the United States, "My Way" debuted at number 24 on the Billboard Hot 100 on the issue dated 8 October 2016. The single opened at number 4 on Digital Songs with 53,000 downloads, and at number 45 on Streaming Songs with 6 million US streams in its first full week. On Radio Songs, it opened 46 following its first full week of airplay (27 million in audience).

Track listing

Charts

Weekly charts

Year-end charts

Certifications

Release history

References

2016 singles
2016 songs
Calvin Harris songs
Songs based on actual events
Songs written by Calvin Harris
Number-one singles in Scotland
Tropical house songs